This is a list of notable footballers who have played for Fenerbahçe. This means players who have played a significant number of matches or have made significant contributions to the club (e.g. championships, captaining). 

For all players who have played for Fenerbahçe, see :Category:Fenerbahçe S.K. footballers. 

Players are listed according to the date of their first professional contracted signed with the club. Appearances and goals are for first-team competitive matches. Substitute appearances included.

List of players
Players highlighted in bold are still actively playing at Fenerbahçe.

Information correct as of the match played on 4 March 2023.

Players
 
Fenerbahce
Association football player non-biographical articles
Players